Brebeuf comes from the name of Saint Jean de Brébeuf, a Jesuit missionary who was martyred in Canada on March 16, 1649. It may also refer to:

Places
 Brébeuf, Quebec, a parish municipality
 Saint-Jean-de-Brébeuf, Quebec, a municipality

People
 Georges de Brébeuf, a French poet and translator

Schools
 Brebeuf College School, a Roman Catholic all-boys' high school
 Brebeuf Jesuit Preparatory School, a private, interfaith college preparatory school
 St. Jean de Brebeuf Catholic High School, a Catholic high school
 St. John Brebeuf Regional Secondary, a Catholic school
 St. Jean de Brebeuf Elementary School, a French language Catholic Elementary School
 Collège Jean-de-Brébeuf, a private French-language educational institution in Montreal, Quebec
  Jean Brébeuf  Sunday School a private church/ Sunday school

Churches
 St. John Brebeuf Catholic Church, a parish
 Eglise St-Jean de Brebeuf, a Catholic church in Sudbury, Ontario

Surnames of Norman origin